Yunlu Palace is a Taoist temple located on the south side of Yuelu Mountain, in Yuelu District of Changsha, Hunan, China. It was originally built in 1478, but because of war has been rebuilt numerous times since then, with the last major one done in 1976.

History

Ming dynasty
It was first built by Vassal King Zhu Jianjun in the Ming dynasty (1368–1644) during the reign of Chenghua Emperor, in the fourteenth year of Chenghua Era (1465–1487). At that time it bore the name Dongzhen Guan.
During the reign of Jiajing Emperor (1522–1566), Changsha prefecture chief Sun Fu ordered Taoist priest Li Kejing to rebuild the temple. In the period of the Longqing Emperor (1567–1572), Taoist priest Jin Shoufen and Zhang Yanghe extended the temple. In the late Ming dynasty, it was destroyed by fire during the Manchu invasion.

Qing dynasty

During the reign of the Kangxi Emperor (1662–1722), local official Zhang Rui rebuilt the temple. In the period of the Qianlong Emperor (1736–1795), the temple consisted of five buildings. In 1852, in the second year of the age of Xianfeng of Xianfeng Emperor (1381–1861), it was destroyed by the Taiping Heavenly Kingdom army. In 1863, in the second year of Tongzhi Era of Tongzhi Emperor (1856–1875), the temple was rebuilt by a Wudang Taoist priest Xiang Jiaohui.

Republic of China
In 1944, the temple was broken down when the Japanese planes bombed Changsha city. Two years later, it was rebuilt by Taoist priest Wu Yunkai and Wu Minghai.

People's Republic of China
After the establishment of the Communist State, the Changsha government rebuilt it in 1957. In 1966, Mao Zedong launched the Cultural Revolution, the Red Guards attacked the temple. In 1976, the local government reopened and renovated the temple.

Architecture

Stele
The stele "Towering Peak of Mt. Yuelu" with 178m in height and 0.74 in width, is inscribed with "Light as Bright as That of the Yizhen Constellation". The stele was fixed in 1927.

Stone fence
The stone fence, is engraved with more than five thousand names of the Nationalists whom died in the Second Sino-Japanese War (1937 - 1945).

References

External links

Buildings and structures in Changsha
Taoist temples in Hunan
Tourist attractions in Changsha
1478 establishments in China
Religious buildings and structures completed in 1478